The 2000 Harvard Crimson football team represented Harvard University in the 2000 NCAA Division I-AA football season.  In their seventh year under head coach Timothy Murphy, the Crimson  finished the season with an overall record of 5–5, placing in a tie for third among Ivy league teams with a conference mark of 4–3. Mike Clare was the team captain.

Harvard played its home games at Harvard Stadium in the Allston neighborhood of Boston, Massachusetts.

Schedule

References

Harvard
Harvard Crimson football seasons
Harvard Crimson football
Harvard Crimson football